Big Time Movie Soundtrack is the second EP by pop group Big Time Rush. The EP is the soundtrack of the television film Big Time Movie, which is based on the Nickelodeon series Big Time Rush. It was released on March 6, 2012.

Background
The soundtrack was announced on February 14, 2012 and consists of six cover songs of the Beatles.

Track listing
All songs were written by John Lennon and Paul McCartney, as part of their Lennon–McCartney partnership. All songs were originally recorded by The Beatles spanning over their 8-year recording career as a group.

Commercial performance
The Big Time Movie Soundtrack was released on March 6, 2012. The soundtrack entered Billboard 200 and peaked at number 44. It only lasted a week on chart.

Charts

References

Columbia Records EPs
Columbia Records soundtracks
2012 EPs
2012 soundtrack albums
Big Time Rush albums
The Beatles tribute albums
Covers EPs